Serqueux station (French: Gare de Serqueux)is a railway station in the commune of Serqueux in the Seine-Maritime department, France.  It is an interchange station between the Amiens–Rouen line and the Gisors–Serqueux–Dieppe line.

History
The station also had a connection to Charleval

Serqueux, an important railway junction, was bombed in World War II. The church and part of the village were destroyed, but the station, with its architecture typical of the Nord company, remained untouched.

In November 2006, the administrative tribunal ruled the closure of the Serqueux–Dieppe section of the Paris Saint-Lazare to Dieppe line to be illegal, but the SNCF had already dismantled the line installations. The right of way has been turned into a greenway between Beaubec-la-Rosière and Saint-Aubin-le-Cauf.

Current service

The station is served by TER Normandie and TER Hauts-de-France trains from Rouen to Amiens and Lille and by TER Normandie trains to Gisors and coaches to Dieppe.

Equipment
The station was electrified with 25 kV 50 Hz alternating current in the course of electrification of the Amiens–Rouen line. The initial section of the Gisors–Serqueux line, which is not yet electrified, is also equipped with catenaries. That line, affected by the government retrenchment of 2009 and closed to commercial traffic since 19 January 2009, could be rapidly modernised.

Renovation of the passenger facilities (work on the passage under the tracks and the carpark, repainting) was planned for 2009.

See also
 List of SNCF stations in Normandy

References

Railway stations in Seine-Maritime
Railway stations in France opened in 1867